The 1985 Norwegian Football Cup was the 80th edition of the Norwegian annual knockout football tournament. The Cup was won by Lillestrøm after beating Vålerengen in the cup final with the score 4–1. This was Lillestrøm's fourth Norwegian Cup title.

First round

|colspan="3" style="background-color:#97DEFF"|24 May 1985

|-
|colspan="3" style="background-color:#97DEFF"|28 May 1985

|-
|colspan="3" style="background-color:#97DEFF"|29 May 1985

|-
|colspan="3" style="background-color:#97DEFF"|30 May 1985

|-
|colspan="3" style="background-color:#97DEFF"|Replay: 5 June 1985

|-
|colspan="3" style="background-color:#97DEFF"|Replay: 6 June 1985

|}

Second round

|colspan="3" style="background-color:#97DEFF"|11 June 1985

|-
|colspan="3" style="background-color:#97DEFF"|12 June 1985

|-
|colspan="3" style="background-color:#97DEFF"|13 June 1985

|-
|colspan="3" style="background-color:#97DEFF"|18 June 1985

|-
|colspan="3" style="background-color:#97DEFF"|Replay: 19 June 1985

|}

Third round

|colspan="3" style="background-color:#97DEFF"|26 June 1985

|-
|colspan="3" style="background-color:#97DEFF"|29 June 1985

|-
|colspan="3" style="background-color:#97DEFF"|Replay: 24 July 1985

|}

Fourth round

|colspan="3" style="background-color:#97DEFF"|31 July 1985

|-
|colspan="3" style="background-color:#97DEFF"|Replay: 7 August 1985

|-
|colspan="3" style="background-color:#97DEFF"|Replay: 15 August 1985

|}

Quarter-finals

|colspan="3" style="background-color:#97DEFF"|21 August 1985

|-
|colspan="3" style="background-color:#97DEFF"|22 August 1985

|}

Semi-finals

Replay

Final

Lillestrøm's winning team: Arne Amundsen, Ole Dyrstad, Georg Hammer, Bård Bjerkeland, Tor Inge Smedås, (Gunnar Halle 79), Rune Richardsen, Kjetil Osvold, Arne Erlandsen, Tom Sundby, Joar Vaadal, (Bjørnar Erlandsen 88), André Krogsæter and (Bjarne Sognnæs on bench).

Vålerengen's team: Espen Muggeby, Jan Erik Aalbu, Jo Bergsvand, Lasse Eriksen, Per Edmund Mordt, Tore Nilsen, (Steinar Enerly 80), Knut Arild Løberg, Vidar Davidsen, Egil Johansen, (Henning Lund 88), Jørn Andersen and Paal Fredheim.

References
 http://www.rsssf.no

Norwegian Football Cup seasons
Norway
Football Cup